Bjarne Hodne (born 15 October 1943) is a Norwegian folklorist.

He defended his dr.philos. degree in 1973 with the thesis Personalhistoriske sagn. En studie i kildeverdi. He worked as a lecturer at the University of Oslo from 1975 to 1976, docent from 1976 to 1984 and professor from 1985. He was the dean of the Historical-Philosophical Faculty (now: the Faculty of Humanities) from 1991 to 1997. He is a member of the Norwegian Academy of Science and Letters. In 2007 he became leader of the trade union Norwegian Association of Researchers.

References

1943 births
Living people
Norwegian folklorists
Academic staff of the University of Oslo
Members of the Norwegian Academy of Science and Letters
Norwegian trade unionists